Armand Joseph Bruat (Colmar, 26 May 1796  – Montebello, off Toulon, 19 November 1855) was a French admiral.

Biography 
Bruat joined the French Navy in 1811, at the height of the Napoleonic Wars. His early career included far-ranging sea duties: in 1815, he served in Brazil and the West Indies. From 1817 to 1820 he was with French forces in the Levant. Then, until 1824, he was stationed first in Senegal and then the Pacific.

As a Lieutenant, Bruat took part in the 1827 Battle of Navarino as maneuver officer on Breslaw. In 1830, he received command of the brig Silène and cruised off Algiers, taking a number of prizes. As Silène followed the Aventure commanded by Félix-Ariel d'Assigny (1794-1846), she was wrecked and the crew was captured during the shipwreck of Dellys, 110 men being massacred. While captive, Bruat managed to transmit observations on the state of the defences of Algier to admiral Duperré.

After the Invasion of Algiers, Bruat was promoted to captain and awarded commanded the Iéna, off Portugal. He then served on Triton, before supervising naval constructions in Toulon from 1841.

In 1843, he was made the Governor of the Marquesas Islands. During this time, he was also France's agent at the court of Queen Pomare of Tahiti, where he was able to convince her to acknowledge a French protectorate over her realm.

In 1849, Bruat became Governor-General of the Antilles and in 1852 was promoted to vice admiral. In 1854, during the Crimean War, he was named Commander of the French Fleet in the Black Sea. He died at sea from cholera, near Toulon, on his flagship, the Montebello, on 19 November 1855.

Honours 
 Grand officer of the Legion of Honour
 Namesake of Cape Bruat, a former name of Musu Dan in North Korea

Sources and references

External link

1796 births
1855 deaths
People from Colmar
Admirals of France
French military personnel of the Napoleonic Wars
French military personnel of the Crimean War
Governors of French Polynesia
Grand Officiers of the Légion d'honneur
Burials at Père Lachaise Cemetery
Knights of the Holy Sepulchre
Governors general of the French Antilles
Deaths from cholera